Arne Sortevik (born 12 March 1947 in Bergen) is a Norwegian politician representing the Progress Party. He is currently a representative of Hordaland in the Storting and was first elected in 2001. He will not seek reelection to the parliament in 2013.

Parliamentary Committee duties 
2005–2013 member of the Transport and Communication committee.
2001–2009 reserve member of the Electoral committee.
2001–2005 member of the Church, Education and Research committee.

References

External links

 Fremskrittspartiet – Biography

1947 births
Living people
Progress Party (Norway) politicians
Members of the Storting
Norwegian Christians
21st-century Norwegian politicians